Johannes Eillebrecht (3 November 1888 – 7 June 1954) was a Greco-Roman wrestler from the Netherlands. He competed at the 1912 Summer Olympics and the 1920 Summer Olympics in the lightweight and middleweight categories, respectively.

References

External links
 

1888 births
1954 deaths
Olympic wrestlers of the Netherlands
Wrestlers at the 1912 Summer Olympics
Wrestlers at the 1920 Summer Olympics
Dutch male sport wrestlers
People from Peel en Maas
Sportspeople from Limburg (Netherlands)